The following is an alphabetical list of topics related to the nation of Dominica.

0–9

.dm – Internet country code top-level domain for Dominica

A
Afro-Dominicans (Dominica)
Americas
North America
North Atlantic Ocean
West Indies
Caribbean Sea
Antilles
Lesser Antilles
Islands of Dominica
Anglo-America
Antilles
Arawak peoples
Arawakan languages
Atlas of Dominica

B
Bayou of Pigs
Bird Rock, Dominica
Boiling Lake
Bouyon music
British Leeward Islands
British West Indies Federation

C
Canefield Airport
Capital of Dominica:  Roseau
Caribbean
Caribbean Community (CARICOM)
Caribbean Sea
Carib Territory
Categories:
:Category:Dominica
:Category:Buildings and structures in Dominica
:Category:Communications in Dominica
:Category:Dominica culture
:Category:Dominica people
:Category:Dominica stubs
:Category:Dominica-related lists
:Category:Economy of Dominica
:Category:Education in Dominica
:Category:Environment of Dominica
:Category:Geography of Dominica

:Category:Government of Dominica
:Category:Health in Dominica
:Category:History of Dominica
:Category:Politics of Dominica
:Category:Society of Dominica
:Category:Sport in Dominica
:Category:Transport in Dominica
commons:Category:Dominica
Coalition for Rainforest Nations
Coat of arms of Dominica
Commonwealth of Nations
Communications in Dominica

D
Demographics of Dominica
Dominica
Dominica at the Commonwealth Games
Dominica at the Olympics
Dominica at the Pan American Games
Dominica Award of Honour
Dominica Broadcasting Corporation
Dominica Channel
Dominica citizenship by investment programme
Dominica Freedom Party
Dominica Labour Party
Dominica national football team
Dominica Passage
Dominican Green-and-yellow Macaw

E
East Caribbean dollar
Eastern Caribbean Supreme Court
Economy of Dominica
Elections in Dominica
Emerald Pool
English colonization of the Americas
English language
Exile One

F
Financial Service Unit of the Commonwealth of Dominica

Flag of Dominica
Foreign relations of Dominica

G
Geography of Dominica
Geology of Dominica
Golden Drum Award
Government House, Dominica

H
History of Dominica
House of Assembly of Dominica

I
International Organization for Standardization (ISO)
ISO 3166-1 alpha-2 country code for Dominica: DM
ISO 3166-1 alpha-3 country code for Dominica: DMA
ISO 3166-2:DM region codes for Dominica
Invasion of Dominica (1761)
Invasion of Dominica (1778)
Islands of Dominica:
Dominica island
Bird Island - also claimed by Venezuela

J
 Jing ping

K
Kadans
Kompa

L
Lesser Antilles
LGBT rights in Dominica (Gay rights)
Lists related to Dominica:
Diplomatic missions of Dominica
List of airports in Dominica
List of bays of Dominica
List of Dominica-related topics
List of flag bearers for Dominica at the Olympics
List of islands of Dominica
List of people of Dominica
List of presidents of Dominica
List of rivers of Dominica
List of universities in Dominica
Topic outline of Dominica

M
Martinique Passage
Melville Hall Airport
Military of Dominica
Morne Diablotin
Morne Trois Pitons National Park
Mountain Chicken
Music of Dominica

N
National Bank of Dominica
North America
Northern Hemisphere

O
Organisation internationale de la Francophonie
Organisation of Eastern Caribbean States (OECS)
Operation Red Dog

P
Politics of Dominica
Portsmouth, Dominica
Postage stamps and postal history of Dominica
Prime Minister of Dominica
Public holidays in Dominica

Q

R
Regional Security System (RSS)
Revenue stamps of Dominica
Roseau – Capital of Dominica

S
The Scout Association of Dominica
Sisserou Award of Honour
Speaker of the House of Assembly of Dominica
Swinging Stars, The

T
Telecommunications in Dominica
Topic outline of Dominica
Transport in Dominica
Tropics

U
United Nations, member state since 1978
United Workers' Party

V

W
WCK
West Indies
UK-West Indies Associated State (WAIS)
(British) West Indies Federation
Western Hemisphere
White Dominican (Dominica)

Wikipedia:WikiProject Topic outline/Drafts/Topic outline of Dominica
Windward Caribbean Kulture
Windward Islands
World Creole Music Festival

X

Y

Z
Zouk

See also

Commonwealth of Nations
List of Caribbean-related topics
List of international rankings
Lists of country-related topics
Topic outline of Dominica
Topic outline of geography
Topic outline of North America
United Nations

References

External links

 
Dominica